Amir Amini (born June 10, 1984, in Rey) is an Iranian professional basketball player. He currently plays as a shooting guard for Naft Sepahan in the Iranian Basketball Super League. He is also a member of the Iranian national basketball team.

Honours

National team
Asian Championship
Gold medal: 2007, 2009
Asian Games
Bronze medal: 2006, 2010
Asian Under-20 Championship
Gold medal: 2004
Asian Under-18 Championship
Silver medal: 2002
Islamic Solidarity Games
Bronze medal: 2005

External links 
  Profile on Kaveh Official Website
 

1984 births
Living people
Asian Games bronze medalists for Iran
Asian Games medalists in basketball
Basketball players at the 2006 Asian Games
Basketball players at the 2008 Summer Olympics
Basketball players at the 2010 Asian Games
Iranian men's basketball players
Medalists at the 2006 Asian Games
Medalists at the 2010 Asian Games
Olympic basketball players of Iran
People from Tehran
Point guards
Islamic Solidarity Games competitors for Iran